The women's 400 metres hurdles event at the 2015 Asian Athletics Championships was held on the 4 and 6 of June.

Medalists

Results

Heats
First 3 in each heat (Q) and the next 2 fastest (q) qualified for the final.

Final

References

400
400 metres hurdles at the Asian Athletics Championships
2015 in women's athletics